Sir David Charles Maurice Bell (born 30 September 1946) is a businessman, publisher and philanthropist.

He is former Director for People at Pearson plc and a former Chairman of the Financial Times (1996 to 2009). In November 2012 he became Chair of the Syndicate of Cambridge University Press.

Background and personal life
Born in Henfield, Sir David was educated at Worth School. He is an alumnus of the University of Pennsylvania and Cambridge University.

He is married to Primrose, with three children.

Career
Having worked at the Oxford Mail (1970 - 1972), Bell became a news editor at the Financial Times in 1978. He rose to Managing Editor (1985 - 1989) before moving to the business side, initially as marketing director (1989 - 1993). He became Chief Executive in 1993 and chairman in 1996 until 2009. He was appointed Director for People at Pearson Group in 1998 and Chairman of Pearson in 2003.

In November 2012 he became Chair of the Syndicate of Cambridge University Press.

Positions
As Chairman of the UK's Millennium Bridge Trust (1995 to 2002) David Bell signed off London's Millennium Bridge, which he could see from his office window at the FT.

He is Chair of the Media Standards Trust, which helps to administer the Orwell Prize.

He is a director of ImagineNations, where he is also Secretary and Treasurer.

He is a Governor at Worth School, a Catholic independent school in Sussex.

Sir David is Chair of Council at Roehampton University.

Sir David is International Chair of the Institute for War & Peace Reporting, iwpr.net.

Sir David is also Chairman of Sadler's Wells.

Sir David is a trustee of Common Purpose UK.

Sir David was chairman of Crisis UK for 10 years until 2012.

Sir David is an assessor on the Leveson Inquiry.

Sir David Bell has been appointed as the non-executive chair of the steering committee driving the development of the National Equality Standard.

He is also on the Royal National Theatre Honorary Council.

Honours
Sir David was made a Knight Bachelor for services to industry, the arts and charity in the Queen's 2004 Birthday Honours.

In 2007, Sir David was awarded an honorary degree from City University London.

References

Living people
People educated at Worth School
University of Pennsylvania alumni
Alumni of Trinity Hall, Cambridge
Financial Times people
Knights Bachelor
1946 births
People from Henfield